Yonemura (written: 米村 lit. "rice plant village") is a Japanese surname. Notable people with the surname include:

Akiko Yonemura (born 1984), Japanese tennis player
, Japanese writer
 (born 1982), Japanese tennis player

Japanese-language surnames